Weiyuan is a town in and the county seat of Jinggu Dai and Yi Autonomous County, Yunnan, China. It is the political, economic, cultural and traffic center of Jinggu Dai and Yi Autonomous County. It is known as "Hometown of Mango".

Administrative division
As of 2016, the town is divided into four communities and twenty-two villages:
 Weiyuan Community
 Mangxiang Community
 Bailong Community
 Fenggang Community
 Mangmao
 Weiyuanjie
 Xinmin
 Minli
 Jiangdong
 Nanjing
 Gonglang
 Hedong
 Longtang
 Lianhe
 Yunhai
 Wenlang
 Xiangyan
 Yong'an
 Naka
 Lianqi
 Xinping
 Keli
 Nuanli
 Xungang
 Wenhui
 Qianjia

History
In February 2006, former Zhongshan Township was merged into Weiyuan.

Geography
It lies at the eastern of Jinggu Dai and Yi Autonomous County, bordering Yongping Town to the west, Yizhi Township and Zhengxing Town to the south, Fengshan Town and Jinggu Town to the north, and Zhengxing Town to the east.

There are two rivers in the town, the Jinggu River and Weiyuan River.

Economy
The region's economy is based on agriculture, animal husbandry, aquaculture, and commerce. The region mainly produce rice. Sugarcane, tobacco, tea, coffee, fruit, vegetable are the economic plants of this region.

Demographics

As of 2020, the National Bureau of Statistics of China estimates the town's population now to be 82,289.

Tourist attractions
The Dazhai Temple and Dongna Temple are Buddhist temples in the town.

Transportation
The town is connected to two highways: the China National Highway 323 and Provincial Highway S222. The China National Highway G323 runs east–west just central of the town. The Provincial Highway S222 starts from the town and goes north.

References

Bibliography

Divisions of Jinggu Dai and Yi Autonomous County
Towns of Pu'er City